The Al-Ahd Party was a political party in Morocco.

History and profile
Al Ahd party was established in March 2002. The founder was Nayib Al Uazzani.

At the last legislative elections, 27 September 2002, the party won 5 out of 325 seats. In the parliamentary election, held on 7 September 2007, the party won together with the National Democratic Party 14 out of 325 seats.

It merged into the Authenticity and Modernity Party in 2008, but soon it left the party the same year.

Najib Ouazzani founded Al Ahd Addimocrati (fr.) in 2009, after Al Ahd merged with the PAM.

Notable members of Al Ahd 

 Najib Ouazzani, long-time Secretary General of the party.
 Said Chaou, MP between 2007 and 2010, currently exiled in the Netherlands.

References

2002 establishments in Morocco
Defunct political parties in Morocco
Political parties established in 2002
Socialist parties in Morocco